KWRD may refer to:

 KWRD-FM, a radio station (100.7 FM) licensed to Highland Village, Texas, United States
 KWRD (AM), a radio station (1470 AM) licensed to Henderson, Texas, United States